Christo Johannes Bezuidenhout (born 14 May 1970) is a Spanish-born former South African international rugby union, that usually played as a prop.

Biography 
Born on the island of Tenerife in the Canary Islands (Spain), where his father worked as a telecommunications engineer. Bezuidenhout debut in the national rugby at Currie Cup in 1994, only to disappear for a few years, apparently to perform agricultural work on the family farm. He reappeared in 1999, when he was contracted by the Bulls in a professional level and the Pumas in the Currie Cup.

He started his career in the South Africa national rugby union team in 33 against New Zealand in the 2003 Tri Nations Series Tournament; A few months later he participated in the 2003 Rugby World Cup in Australia with only 3 appearances, which were his last international.

In 2004 he moved to England to Gloucester for a season, after which he retired from rugby.

References

External links 
 
 
Springbok Rugby Hall of Fame profile

1970 births
People from Tenerife
Sportspeople from the Province of Santa Cruz de Tenerife
South African rugby union players
Gloucester Rugby players
Living people
South Africa international rugby union players
Rugby union props
South African expatriate sportspeople in England
South African expatriate rugby union players
Expatriate rugby union players in England
Rugby union players from Gauteng